Bryn Jones (born 8 February 1948) is a Welsh former professional footballer who played as a midfielder.

Career
Born in Llandrindod Wells, Jones played for Cardiff City, Newport County, Bristol Rovers and Yeovil Town.

References

1948 births
Living people
Welsh footballers
Wales under-23 international footballers
Cardiff City F.C. players
Newport County A.F.C. players
Bristol Rovers F.C. players
Yeovil Town F.C. players
English Football League players
People from Llandrindod Wells
Sportspeople from Powys
Association football midfielders